Argo is a public artwork by Russian-American artist Alexander Liberman located on the south lawn of the Milwaukee Art Museum, which is in Milwaukee, Wisconsin, U.S.. The artwork was made in 1974 from steel cylinders painted with a reflective white epoxy finish.

Description
Alex Liberman's impressive steel sculpture was originally located in an outdoor exhibition in Newport, Rhode Island. Mrs. Harry Lynde (Peg) Bradley purchased the sculpture because she determined it would complement the architecture of the newly enlarged Milwaukee Art Center building, which had been largely financed by the Bradley funds. Argo became the first sculpture on the grounds of the museums new wing. With its form of white circles and cylinders, the sculpture not only enhances the building, but, when viewed from the west, appears to float on the surface of the water. This effect is exactly as the artist intended, as implied by the title, Argo-the heroic adventure ship of the ancient Greeks.
Argo, with its reflective white epoxy paint finish and correct sitting, is a fine example of the Artist's 1970's style of monumental geometric sculpture. During this period the artist was interested in the interplay between positive and negative spaces. Examples of other Liberman styles and sculptures can be seen at the Bradley Sculpture Garden.

History
Initially during the summer of 1974, the sculpture was located in Newport, Rhode Island. Mounted a large contemporary outdoor exhibition entitled "Monumenta". Alexander Liberman's Argo, sited on the edge of the water, received favorable notice and reviews.

Mrs. Harry Lynde Bradley purchased the sculpture because she determined it would complement the architecture of the newly enlarged Milwaukee Art Center building, which had been largely financed by the Bradley funds.

Further reading
Buck, Diane M. and Virginia A. Palmer (1995). Outdoor Sculpture in Milwaukee: A Cultural and Historical Guidebook, The State Historical Society of Wisconsin, Madison.

References

1974 sculptures
Outdoor sculptures in Milwaukee
Sculptures by Alexander Liberman
Steel sculptures in Wisconsin